Dasht-e Taybad Rural District is a rural district (dehestan) in Miyan Velayat District, Taybad County, Razavi Khorasan Province, Iran. At the 2006 census, its population was 11,315, in 2,361 families.  The rural district has 12 villages.

References 

Rural Districts of Razavi Khorasan Province
Taybad County